Long-jawed orb weavers or long jawed spiders (Tetragnathidae) are a family of araneomorph spiders first described by Anton Menge in 1866. They have elongated bodies, legs, and chelicerae, and build small orb webs with an open hub with few, wide-set radii and spirals with no signal line or retreat. Some species are often found in long vegetation near water.

Systematics

, the World Spider Catalog accepts the following extant genera:

Alcimosphenus Simon, 1895 — Caribbean
Allende Álvarez-Padilla, 2007 — Chile, Argentina
Antillognatha Bryant, 1945 — Hispaniola
Atelidea Simon, 1895 — Sri Lanka
Azilia Keyserling, 1881 — United States, Panama, South America, Caribbean
Chrysometa Simon, 1894 — South America, Central America, Mexico, Caribbean
Cyrtognatha Keyserling, 1881 — South America, Central America, Caribbean, Mexico
Dianleucauge Song & Zhu, 1994 — China
Diphya Nicolet, 1849 — Asia, South America, Africa
Dolichognatha O. Pickard-Cambridge, 1869 — Asia, Africa, South America, Oceania, United States, Panama
Doryonychus Simon, 1900 — Hawaii
Dyschiriognatha Simon, 1893 — Indonesia, Brazil, Samoa
Glenognatha Simon, 1887 — Africa, South America, Asia, North America, Central America, Caribbean
Guizygiella Zhu, Kim & Song, 1997 — Asia
Harlanethis Álvarez-Padilla, Kallal & Hormiga, 2020 —  Australia (Queensland)
Hispanognatha Bryant, 1945 — Hispaniola
Homalometa Simon, 1898 — Central America, Cuba, Mexico, Brazil
Iamarra Álvarez-Padilla, Kallal & Hormiga, 2020 — Australia (Queensland) 
Leucauge White, 1841 — Africa, North America, Asia, Oceania, South America, Central America, Caribbean
Mecynometa Simon, 1894 — Africa, Guatemala, Brazil
Mesida Kulczyński, 1911 — Oceania, Asia, Africa
Meta C. L. Koch, 1836 — Asia, North America, Tanzania, Oceania, Cuba
Metabus O. Pickard-Cambridge, 1899 — Mexico, Guatemala, Ecuador, Dominican Republic
Metellina Chamberlin & Ivie, 1941 — Africa, Asia, Canada
Metleucauge Levi, 1980 — Asia, United States
Mitoscelis Thorell, 1890 — Indonesia
Mollemeta Álvarez-Padilla, 2007 — Chile
Nanningia Zhu, Kim & Song, 1997
Nanometa Simon, 1908 — Australia
Neoprolochus Reimoser, 1927 — Indonesia
Okileucauge Tanikawa, 2001 — China, Japan
Opadometa Archer, 1951 — Asia, Papua New Guinea
Opas O. Pickard-Cambridge, 1896 — South America, Mexico, Panama
Orsinome Thorell, 1890 — Asia, Oceania, Madagascar
Pachygnatha Sundevall, 1823 — Africa, Asia, North America, Cuba, Europe
Parameta Simon, 1895 — Ethiopia, Somalia, Sierra Leone
Parazilia Lessert, 1938 — Congo
Pholcipes Schmidt & Krause, 1993 — Comoros
Pickardinella Archer, 1951 — Mexico
Pinkfloydia Dimitrov & Hormiga, 2011 — Australia
Sancus Tullgren, 1910 — Kenya, Tanzania
Schenkeliella Strand, 1934 — Sri Lanka
Taraire Álvarez-Padilla, Kallal & Hormiga, 2020 — New Zealand
Tawhai Álvarez-Padilla, Kallal & Hormiga, 2020 — New Zealand
Tetragnatha Latreille, 1804 — Asia, South America, Oceania, Africa, North America, Caribbean, Central America, Europe
Timonoe Thorell, 1898 — Myanmar
Tylorida Simon, 1894 — Asia, Africa, Oceania
Wolongia Zhu, Kim & Song, 1997 — China
Zhinu Kallal & Hormiga, 2018 — Taiwan, Korea, Japan
Zygiometella Wunderlich, 1995 — Israel

Fossil genera
Several extinct, fossil genera have been described:

 †Anameta Wunderlich, 2004 (Palaeogene, Bitterfield and Baltic amber)
 †Balticgnatha Wunderlich, 2004 (Palaeogene, Baltic amber)
 †Corneometa Wunderlich, 2004 (Palaeogene, Baltic amber)
 †Eometa Petrunkevitch, 1958 (Palaeogene, Baltic amber)
 †Huergnina Selden & Penney, 2003 (Cretaceous, Las Hoyas, Spain)
 †Macryphantes Selden, 1990 (Cretaceous)
 †Palaeometa Petrunkevitch, 1922 (Palaeogene, Florissant)
 †Palaeopachygnatha Petrunkevitch, 1922 (Palaeogene, Florissant)
 †Priscometa Petrunkevitch, 1958 (Palaeogene, Baltic amber)
 †Samlandicmeta Wunderlich, 2012 (Palaeogene, Baltic amber)

Formerly placed here
 Deliochus Simon, 1894 – now in Araneidae
 Eryciniolia Strand, 1912 – now a synonym of Nanometa
 Menosira Chikuni, 1955 – now a synonym of Metellina
 Nediphya Marusik & Omelko, 2017 – now a synonym of Nanometa
 Phonognatha Simon, 1894 – now in Araneidae
 Prolochus Thorell, 1895 – see Dolichognatha

See also
A few spiders in this family include:
List of Tetragnathidae species
Leucauge mariana
Leucauge argyra
Leucauge venusta

References

 Chickering, A.M. (1963). The Male of Mecynometa globosa (O. P.-Cambridge) (Araneae, Argiopidae). Psyche 70:180–183. PDF

External links 
 Tree of Life Tetragnathidae
 Tatragnatha sp. Large format diagnostic photographs and information
 Reference Photos: Tetragnatha laboriosa
 Venusta Orchard Spider - Family Tetragnathidae
 Pictures of Tetragnatha sp. (free for noncommercial use)

Articles containing video clips